Nightingale–Olympic or The Nightingale–Olympic Co.,LTD. (or Nightingale is a department store in Thailand. It is the oldest shopping mall that still operating in Bangkok and all of Thailand, located at Tri Phet Road, Phra Nakhon District, Bangkok's Wang Burapha and Phahurat neighborhoods.

Nightingale opened in 1930 (two years before Siamese revolution) by Nat Niyomvanich, a Dawoodi Bohra descent businessman, starting with a single shophouse near Sala Chalermkrung Royal Theatre. Later, on August 5, 1966, it officially opened under the present name Nightingale–Olympic.

Nightingale was considered to be a popular shopping mall in the 1960s, when the shopping centers of Wang Burapha (Buraphaphirom Palace) area were popular among teenagers of those days like Siam Square in modern times. It is the center of cosmetics, stationeries, fashion clothes, lingeries, musical instruments, beauty salons, sports goods and also Thailand's first fitness club. It uses the slogan "Hub of Sporting Goods, King of Musical Instruments, Queen of Cosmetics".

Currently, Nightingale has seven floors of three shophouses operated by Aroon Niyomvanich, a younger sister of Nat the founder, now she is over 90 years old.

See also
List of shopping malls in Bangkok

References

External links

Department stores of Thailand
Phra Nakhon district
1930 establishments in Siam
Commercial buildings completed in 1930
Buildings and structures in Bangkok